Randall Erich Gnant (born 1945) is an American politician. He served as President of the Arizona Senate. He filed for a run for Governor of Arizona. Gnant is a Republican and served District 28. He was succeeded by Carolyn Allen.

References

External links

 Randall Gnant bio via Arizona State Legislature

Living people
1945 births
Republican Party Arizona state senators
Presidents of the Arizona Senate